Fort D.A. Russell was the name of two United States Military posts:

Fort D.A. Russell (Wyoming), Cheyenne, Wyoming
Fort D.A. Russell (Texas), Marfa, Texas